Skjomen Church is a parish church of the Church of Norway in Narvik Municipality in Nordland county, Norway.  It is located in the village of Elvegård. It is the church for the Skjomen parish which is part of the Ofoten prosti (deanery) in the Diocese of Sør-Hålogaland. The white, wooden church was built in a long church style in 1893 using plans drawn up by the architect Ole Scheistrøen. The church seats about 240 people. The building was consecrated on 17 July 1893.

See also
List of churches in Sør-Hålogaland

References

Narvik
Churches in Nordland
Wooden churches in Norway
19th-century Church of Norway church buildings
Churches completed in 1893
1893 establishments in Norway
Long churches in Norway